Catherine Thomson "Kate" Dickens (née Hogarth; 19 May 1815 – 22 November 1879) was the wife of English novelist Charles Dickens, the mother of his ten children, and a writer of domestic management.

Early life

Born in Edinburgh, Scotland, in 1815, Catherine moved to England with her family in 1824.
She was the eldest daughter of ten children to George Hogarth. Her father was a journalist for the Edinburgh Courant, and later became a writer and music critic for the Morning Chronicle, where Dickens was a young journalist, and later the editor of the Evening Chronicle. Dickens immediately took a liking to the attractive 19-year-old Catherine and invited her to his 23rd birthday party. Catherine and Dickens later became engaged in 1835 and were married on 2 April 1836 in St Luke's Church, Chelsea, going on their honeymoon in Chalk, near Chatham in Kent.  They set up a home in Bloomsbury, and went on to have ten children. During that period, Charles wrote that even if he were to become rich and famous, he would never be as happy as he was in that small flat with Catherine.

Catherine's sister, Mary Hogarth, entered Dickens's Doughty Street household to offer support to her newly married sister and brother-in-law. It was usual for an unwed sister of a wife to live with and help a newly married couple. Dickens became very attached to Mary, and she died in his arms after a brief illness in 1837. She became a character in many of his books, and her death is fictionalised as the death of Little Nell.

Catherine's younger sister, Georgina Hogarth, joined the Dickens family household in 1842 when Dickens and Catherine sailed to the United States, caring for the young family they had left behind. During their trip, Dickens wrote in a letter to a friend that Catherine never felt gloomy or lost courage throughout their long journey by ship, and "adapted to any circumstances without complaint". In 1845, Charles Dickens produced the amateur theatrical Every Man in his Humour for the benefit of Leigh Hunt.  In a subsequent performance, Catherine Dickens, who had a minor role, fell through a trap door. In 1851, as 'Lady Maria Clutterbuck', Catherine Dickens published a cookery book, What Shall we Have for Dinner? Satisfactorily Answered by Numerous Bills of Fare for from Two to Eighteen Persons. It contained many suggested menus for meals of varying complexity together with a few recipes. It went through several editions until 1860. Also in 1851, she had a nervous breakdown after the death of her daughter, Dora Annie Dickens, aged seven months.

Over the subsequent years, Dickens claimed Catherine became an increasingly incompetent mother and housekeeper; he also blamed her for the birth of their ten children, which caused him financial worries. He had hoped to have no more after the birth of their fourth son Walter, and he claimed that her coming from a large family had caused so many children to be born. To ensure no more children could be born, he ordered their bed to be separated and put a bookshelf in between them. He also tried to have her falsely diagnosed as mentally ill in order to commit her to an asylum.  Their separation in May 1858, after Catherine accidentally received a bracelet meant for Ellen Ternan, was much publicised, and rumours of Dickens's affairs were numerous—all of which he strenuously denied.

Separation

In June 1858, Charles and Catherine Dickens separated, and she moved into a property on Gloucester Crescent in Camden Town. The exact cause of the separation is unknown, although attention at the time and since has focused on rumours of an affair between Dickens and Ellen Ternan and/or Catherine's sister, Georgina Hogarth.

A bracelet intended for Ellen Ternan had supposedly been delivered to the Dickens household some months previously, leading to accusation and denial. Dickens's friend, William Makepeace Thackeray, later asserted that Dickens's separation from Catherine was due to a liaison with Ternan, rather than with Georgina Hogarth as had been put to him.  This remark coming to Dickens's attention, Dickens was so infuriated that it almost put an end to the Dickens–Thackeray friendship.

Georgina, Charles and all of the children except Charles Dickens Jr., remained in their home at Tavistock House, while Catherine and Charles Jr. moved out. Georgina Hogarth ran Dickens's household. On 12 June 1858, he published an article in his journal, Household Words, denying rumours about the separation while neither articulating them nor clarifying the situation.

He sent this statement to the newspapers, including The Times, and many reprinted it. He fell out with Bradbury and Evans, his publishers, because they refused to publish his statement in Punch as they thought it unsuitable for a humorous periodical. Another public statement appeared in the New York Tribune, which later found its way into several British newspapers. In this statement, Dickens declared that it had been only Georgina Hogarth who had held the family together for some time:

Later years
Dickens and Catherine had little correspondence after their separation, but she remained attached and loyal to her husband and to his memory until her death from cancer. On her deathbed in 1879, Catherine gave the collection of letters she had received from Dickens to her daughter Kate, telling her to "Give these to the British Museum – that the world may know [Charles] loved me once".

Catherine Dickens was buried in Highgate Cemetery in London with her infant daughter Dora, who had died in 1851, aged seven months.

In the media
Catherine Dickens was the subject of the sixty-minute BBC Two documentary Mrs Dickens' Family Christmas, broadcast on 30 December 2011 and performed and presented by Sue Perkins, and which looked at the marriage of Charles Dickens through the eyes of Catherine.

In the 1976 series Dickens of London, she was portrayed by Adrienne Burgess.

In the 2013 film The Invisible Woman, she was portrayed by Joanna Scanlan.

In the 2017 film The Man Who Invented Christmas, she was portrayed by Morfydd Clark.

References

Bibliography
 Nayder, Lillian (2011). The Other Dickens: A Life of Catherine Hogarth, Ithaca, New York: Cornell University Press, .  Disputes Charles Dickens' claim that Catherine was an unfit wife and mother.

External links

Catherine Dickens on the Charles Dickens Page
The Marriage of Charles Dickens

1815 births
1879 deaths
Charles Dickens
19th-century Scottish women
Women of the Victorian era
Burials at Highgate Cemetery
People from Edinburgh